Laurentian Elite is a Canadian political term used to refer individuals in the upper class of society who live along the St. Lawrence River and watershed in major cities such as Montreal, Ottawa and Toronto, an area which represents a significant portion of Canada’s population. This group included politicians from both the Liberal Party of Canada and the former Progressive Conservative Party of Canada, and is believed to still be influential in guiding Liberal Party policy.

The term was coined by journalist John Ibbitson in 2011. Ibbitson used the term Laurentian Consensus to describe the belief that a general governing political consensus existed in Canada from Confederation until the early twenty first century with the election of Stephen Harper and the Conservative Party of Canada with a majority government in the 2011 Canadian Federal Election without significant support in Quebec.

Ibbitson described the Laurentians as “the political, academic, cultural, media and business elites” of central Canada who were responsible for shaping Canadian identity. This concept of the Laurentian Elites and the political consensus that was postulated to exist was expanded in the book The Big Shift: The Seismic Change in Canadian Politics, Business, and Culture and What It Means for Our Future published in 2013 by Darrell Bricker and John Ibbitson.

See also
Quebec City-Windsor Corridor
Liberal elite
Politics of Canada
Western Alienation
Quebec Separatism
Central Canada

References

Canadian political phrases
Political party factions in Canada
Social class in Canada
Regionalism (politics)
Elite theory